Ernest Papa Arko is a Ghanaian former footballer. He played as a forward and won many caps with Asante Kotoko and the Ghana national football team.

Education
He was a student of the Konongo Odumase Senior High School where he was the captain of the football team.

Club football
Arko played for Asante Kotoko in the late 1970s and early 1980s. He was the captain of the team in 1980 at a time they were thought to be the most talented. They went on to be finalists in the 1982 African Cup of Champions Clubs competition where they lost to Al Ahly SC of Egypt. He continued to lead the team in 1983, the year they last won the 1983 CAF Champions League. He is often listed among the club legends.

International career
Arko played in the 1980 African Cup of Nations where Ghana failed to defend its title. He was also in the team that played in the 1984 African Nations Cup tournament.

Honours
1983 African Cup of Champions Clubs - Winner

References

Living people
Asante Kotoko S.C. players
Ghanaian footballers
Ghana international footballers
1980 African Cup of Nations players
1984 African Cup of Nations players
Ghanaian football managers
Association football forwards
Year of birth missing (living people)
Konongo Odumase Senior High School alumni